Malcolm Squires (b 1946) is a Church in Wales priest: most notably Archdeacon of Wrexham from  2001 to 2010.

Squires was educated at St Chad's College, Durham and ordained in 1975. After  a curacies in Headingley and Stanningley he was the Vicar of Bradshaw from 1980 to 1985. He was at Mirfield from 1985 to 1996; and at Wrexham from then until his retirement.

References

1946 births
Living people
Archdeacons of Wrexham
Alumni of St Chad's College, Durham
20th-century Welsh Anglican priests
21st-century Welsh Anglican priests